Batman: The Dark Knight Returns is a two-part direct-to-video animated superhero film, an adaptation of the 1986 comic book The Dark Knight Returns by Frank Miller and is set in the same continuity as Batman: Year One. It was directed by Jay Oliva, who worked as a storyboard artist on Man of Steel, Under the Red Hood, Year One and Batman v Superman: Dawn of Justice. Several other Batman veterans were also involved in the film. Part 1 was released on September 25, 2012, and Part 2 was released on January 29, 2013.  A deluxe edition combining both films was released on October 8, 2013. It is the 15th film of the DC Universe Animated Original Movies.

Plot

Part One

After the death of his protégé Jason Todd, Bruce Wayne retired his Batman persona. Ten years later, in mid-1986, Gotham City is overrun with crime and terrorized by a gang known as the Mutants. The 55-year-old Wayne maintains a friendship with 70-year-old retiring Police Commissioner James Gordon (who knows Wayne was Batman), although he has lost touch with Dick Grayson and has not talked to him in a while, while the Joker (Batman's archenemy) has been catatonic in Arkham Asylum since Wayne's retirement. Arkham inmate and former district attorney Harvey Dent undergoes plastic surgery to repair his disfigured face. Although he is declared sane, he quickly goes into hiding following his release. Dent's disappearance, news stories of the crime epidemic, and the memory of his parents' deaths drive Wayne to become Batman once more. He combats serious crimes, rescuing 13-year-old Carrie Kelley, but now struggles with the physical limitations of age.

Public reaction to his return is divided. Dent's psychologist Bartholomew Wolper blames Batman for creating his own rogues gallery. Dent resurfaces, threatening to blow up a building unless he is paid a ransom. Batman defeats Dent's henchmen, learning that the bombs will explode even if the ransom is paid; he realizes that Dent intends to kill himself. Batman disables one bomb, and the other detonates harmlessly. He defeats Dent, who reveals that he thinks the reconstructive surgery was botched, as he considered his undamaged half as disfigured. Kelley dresses as Robin and looks for Batman, who attacks a gathering of the Mutants with a tank-like Batmobile (incapacitating most of them). The Mutant leader challenges Batman to a duel. He accepts to prove to himself that he can win. The Mutant leader (who is in his prime) nearly kills Batman, but Kelley distracts him long enough for Batman to subdue him. The leader and many gang members are arrested. Injured, Batman returns to the Batcave with Kelley, and allows her to become his protégé in spite of protests from his butler, Alfred Pennyworth.

Batman has Kelley disguise herself as a Mutant, and she lures the gang to a sewer outlet at the West River. At the Gotham City Police Department, the Mutant leader murders the mayor during negotiations. Commissioner Gordon deliberately releases the leader, providing an escape from the building, which leads to the sewer outlet. Before the amassed Mutants, Batman fights the leader in a mud pit; the mud slows the leader, removing his physical advantage, and Batman overpowers him. Seeing their leader's defeat, the Mutants divide into smaller gangs, with one becoming the "Sons of Batman", a violent vigilante group. Batman's victory becomes public and the city's inhabitants are inspired to stand up against crime. Gordon retires after meeting his anti-Batman successor, Ellen Yindel. In Arkham, televised reports about Batman bring the Joker out of his catatonic state.

Part Two

In late 1986, feigning remorse for his past, Joker convinces Wolper to take him on a talk show to tell his story, and makes plans for his escape with Abner, an old henchman who supplies him with mind-controlling lipstick. Meanwhile, Clark Kent a.k.a. Superman, who works as a government operative in exchange for being allowed to covertly help people, is asked by President Ronald Reagan to end Batman's vigilantism. Framing these events is a growing hostility between the US and the Soviet Union over possession of the island of Corto Maltese. As Batman's continued presence humiliates the national authorities,  Commissioner Yindel orders Batman's arrest, and Clark warns Bruce that the government will not tolerate him much longer.

Joker makes his talk show appearance on David Endochrine's show as Batman fights with the GCPD on the studio roof; while they fight, Joker kills Wolper, gasses everyone in the studio to death and escapes. He finds Selina Kyle and uses one of her escorts and his lipstick to take control of a congressional representative, who calls for a nuclear strike on the Soviets before falling to his death. Batman's investigation leads him to Selina, whom he finds bound and dressed like Wonder Woman. Kelley notices cotton candy on the floor, and Batman deduces that Joker is at the fairgrounds. There Kelley accidentally kills Abner while Batman pursues the Joker, who indiscriminately guns down dozens of people. As Batman corners a wounded and partially blinded Joker, he admits to feeling responsible for every murder Joker has committed and intends to kill him. In the ensuing fight, Joker stabs Batman repeatedly, and Batman breaks Joker's neck in front of witnesses.  However, Joker is still alive, albeit paralyzed from the neck-down. Content that Batman will be branded a murderer, the Joker then commits suicide by breaking his own neck. The GCPD arrive and Batman, bleeding profusely, fights his way to Kelley and escapes.

Superman deflects a Soviet nuclear missile, but is hit with the blast and badly injured. The detonation creates an electromagnetic pulse that wipes out all electrical equipment in the United States and causes a nuclear winter. As Gotham descends into chaos, Batman, Kelley and Gordon rally the Sons of Batman and the citizens of Gotham to restore order, and Yindel accepts that Batman has become too powerful to take down. While the rest of America is powerless and overrun with crime, Gotham becomes the safest city in the country, embarrassing the President's administration. Frustrated they weren't able to bring stability, Superman and troops are sent to finally stop Batman. Batman and Superman agree to meet in Crime Alley.

Superman can't help but feel remorse for disregarding Batman throughout the years, and humbly asks him not to go through the fight. Wearing a powerful exoframe and backed by Kelley and former superhero Oliver Queen (Green Arrow), Batman fights Superman, using various tactics to make the fight even, and banking on Superman feeling the after effects of the nuclear missile explosion and lack of sunlight. When Superman gains the advantage, Queen hits him with an arrow made with synthetic Kryptonite, severely weakening him. Batman brutally beats Superman, claiming that he intentionally made the Kryptonite weak, and tells Superman never to forget that Batman could have killed him whenever he wanted. Batman then apparently dies of a heart attack, while Wayne Manor self-destructs, and Alfred dies of a stroke. Superman holds Batman's body, and angrily orders the soldiers to stand down.

In the aftermath, the world learns that Bruce was Batman; all of his secrets are destroyed with the manor and his finances disappear. As Superman leaves Wayne's funeral, he gives Kelley a knowing wink after hearing a faint heartbeat coming from Bruce's coffin. In a cave, Bruce is revealed to have faked his death to make preparations to continue his mission more discreetly, allied with Kelley, Queen, and his followers.

Cast
Introduced in Part 1
 Peter Weller as Bruce Wayne / Batman
 Ariel Winter as Carrie Kelley / Robin
 David Selby as Commissioner James Gordon
 Wade Williams as Harvey Dent / Two-Face
 Michael Emerson as The Joker
 Dee Bradley Baker as Don, bakery owner, mutant in yellow jacket
 Maria Canals-Barrera as Commissioner Ellen Yindel
 Gwendoline Yeo as Lola Chang
 Paget Brewster as Lana Lang / Carrie Kelley's mother
 Grey DeLisle as Anchorwoman Carla 
 Richard Doyle as The Mayor of Gotham City
 Michael Jackson as Alfred Pennyworth
 Yuri Lowenthal as The Sons of Batman and other additional voices (uncredited)
 Michael McKean as Dr. Bartholomew Wolper
 James Patrick Stuart as Murray
 James Arnold Taylor as Mr. Hudson, Spud, additional voices
 Bruce Timm as Thomas Wayne
 Frank Welker as Deputy Mayor Stevenson
 Gary Anthony Williams as Mutant Leader
 Rob Paulsen as Rob
 Townsend Coleman as Morrie
Introduced in Part 2
 Mark Valley as Clark Kent / Superman
 Robin Atkin Downes as Oliver Queen
 Tress MacNeille as Selina Kyle / Bruno / Old Lady 
 Jim Meskimen as President Ronald Reagan
 Conan O'Brien as David Endochrine
 Townsend Coleman as Abner
 Andy Richter as Frank
 Tara Strong as Additional Voices (uncredited)

Music
Christopher Drake, veteran DC Animated Universe composer, scored both parts of the film. A deluxe two-disc edition soundtrack was released on October 8, 2013, to coincide with the deluxe version of the film.

Reception

Sales 

Part 1 earned $5,993,747 from domestic home video sales, while Part 2 earned $4,283,741, which bought total home video earnings to $10,277,488.

Critical response

IGN reviewer Joey Esposito gave Part 1 a score of 7.5 out of 10, praising the voice performances and animation. Esposito noted that the newscasters' segments do not translate well to the screen and lack the thematic punch they had in the comic, making them extraneous at best. He also criticized Batman's inner monologue and the poor quality of the DVD extras. Esposito went on to give Part 2 a score of 8.6 out of 10, praising Michael Emerson's portrayal of the Joker, as well as an improvement in Blu-ray extras. Gil Kellerman of Collider.com praised Part 1 overall, praising Weller's portrayal of Batman but also denigrating the DVD extras. 
Spencer Perry at SuperHeroHype considers Part 1 to be "one of the best Batman films ever made", scoring it nine out of ten. Noel Murray of The A.V. Club gave Part 1 a grade B+, saying that "there are ways in which the animated Dark Knight Returns gets across Miller's vision even better than the comics page did."

Kofi Outlaw of Screen Rant gave Part 2 three out of five stars, criticizing the outdated Cold War subplot as "a major distraction from an otherwise focused narrative", as well as the toning down of the Joker's character. He went on to say that "The film is a lovingly faithful recreation of the story that spawned it - for better or for worse, depending on the viewer."

Accolades 

Part 1 received a Golden Reel Awards nomination for Best Sound Editing in Direct to Video Animation.

References

External links
  
 

2010s American animated films
2010s animated superhero films
2010s direct-to-video animated superhero films
2012 animated films
2012 direct-to-video films
2012 films
2012 science fiction action films
2013 animated films
2013 direct-to-video films
2013 films
2013 science fiction action films
Animated action films
Animated Batman films
American dystopian films
American vigilante films
Animated science fiction films
Cold War films
Cultural depictions of Ronald Reagan
DC Universe Animated Original Movies
Films about extraterrestrial life
Films about old age
Films about nuclear war and weapons
Films based on works by Frank Miller
Films directed by Jay Oliva
Films released in separate parts
Films set in 1986
Films set in amusement parks
Green Arrow in other media
Toonami
2010s English-language films